Tekel A.Ş. (Turkish, literally single-hand or monopoly and generally capitalised as TEKEL) was a Turkish tobacco and alcoholic beverages company. It was nationalised in 1925 from a parastatal (government owned/controlled) company, the Régie. A joint foreign and Ottoman consortium, the Régie was short for "La Société de la régie co-intéressée des tabacs de l'Empire Ottoman".

Tekel evolved into the sole manufacturer and distributor of all alcohol and tobacco products in Turkey. Today, Tekel is no longer a monopoly but it does control taxing and distribution of all alcohol and tobacco products in Turkey.

In 2008 it was sold to British American Tobacco and discontinued as a trademark in cigarettes, wines, liquors or other products, although some of its brand names are still used without the word "Tekel" preceding them; like the Buzbağ wine.

History

Foundation and early history

Turkish tobacco was an important industrial crop, where its cultivation and manufacture were monopolies under capitulations of the Ottoman Empire. The tobacco and cigarette trade was controlled by two companies the "Regie Compagnie interessee des tabacs de l'empire Ottoman", and French "Narquileh tobacco." These companies founded as a monopoly in 1862 by the Ottoman government for the payment of its international debt. Original purpose of the company was to deal with tobacco products.

For the first time in 1862, via commercial agreements between the Ottoman Government, France and Britain, tobacco importation had been prohibited and monopoly had been established.

In accordance with the “Rusumu Sitte” Decree published in 1879, the monopoly income of salt, tobacco and alcohol went to the Ottoman Public Debt Administration, and the operation of the Tobacco Monopoly was transferred to the Ottoman Tobacco Company.

The duty of performing the “monopoly” tasks regarding tobacco, alcohol drinks, salt, gunpowder and explosives had been appointed to the Monopolies Public directorate starting at its founding in 1932.

Specifically, tobacco, alcohol drinks and salt have been taken under the state monopoly in the year 1932, gunpowder and explosives in 1934, beer in 1939, tea and coffee in 1942, and matches in 1946. Coffee has been released from the State monopoly in 1946, matches in 1952, gunpowder and explosives and beer in 1955 and tobacco in 1986.

Privatisation
In the early 2000s, then Turkish Prime Minister Bülent Ecevit pushed through controversial legislation which would allow for the privatisation of Tekel.

In January 2003, then Turkish Deputy Prime Minister Abdullatif Sener announced plans to privatise Tekel in the first half of the year, as part of a $16bn loan agreement with the International Monetary Fund (IMF), stating, "These are privatisations which have been planned for years and should have been taken care of a long time ago." He promised that the jobs of workers affected by the privatisations would be safeguarded but warned unprofitable businesses would be closed down.

These privatisation plans were dropped in November of that year when the leading $1.15bn bid by Japan Tobacco International was deemed too far below government expectations. Turkey's operating environment, perceived problems with regulation, and competition with major players such as Philip Morris and Japan Tobacco International, already active in the Turkish market, were thought by analysts to have lowered the bids.

Tekel was eventually bought by the UK-based British American Tobacco (BAT) in a televised auction on 22 February 2008 for $1.72bn, making it the second largest tobacco company in the country with a 36% market share.

2009–10 industrial action
In December 2009, following the privatisation, the Turkish government announced that 12 Tekel factories would close with the 10,000 workers redeployed in other public sector jobs on 11-month temporary contracts (4/C status) with pay-cuts up to 40% and reduced employment rights. This sparked industrial action, which began on 15 December, by the workers who claimed the changes would cut their monthly wage and leave them without any severance pay. An estimated 12,000 workers from across the country set up camp in a central park in Ankara where they were forced off with teargas and pepper spray fired by riot police. They subsequently reestablished their camp in front of the head office of Turkey's main trade union organisation, Confederation of Turkish Trade Unions (Türk-İş). The protestors have engaged in public demonstrations outside the headquarters of the ruling Justice and Development Party (AKP) and several protestors have been admitted to hospital after refusing food and water.

Media images of the protests have provoked angry rows in the Turkish parliament and analysts believe the situation has inflicted political damage on a government heavily reliant on conservative working-class support but Turkish Prime Minister Recep Tayyip Erdoğan said the government would not "dole out money to workers for not producing anything" and challenged the protestors, who he claims are being influenced by "ideological groups and extremists" who had turned it into an "anti-government campaign," to start their own businesses and ordered Finance Minister  Mehmet Şimşek and Labour Minister Hayati Yazıcı to find a formula to resolve the dispute.

On 4 February 2010 tens of thousands of Turkish workers took part in a one-day general strike organised by Türk-İş in support of the protest. Public services including transport were disrupted across the country and the largest demonstrations were reported in Ankara (20,000 demonstrators) and İzmir (15,000 demonstrators).

See also
 Turkish wine
 Buzbağ
 Raki
 "Tütün Rejisi" (:tr)

References

External links

  (archived)

Food and drink companies based in Istanbul
Manufacturing companies based in Istanbul
Companies established in 1862
Tobacco companies of Turkey
Alcohol monopolies
British American Tobacco
1862 establishments in the Ottoman Empire
Drink companies of Turkey